Big Eye Little Eye is the second studio album of the Canadian rock group The Golden Dogs. The album features its first single "Never Meant Any Harm" and follow-up single "Construction Worker". Music videos were released for both songs. It also includes a cover of Wings's song "Nineteen Hundred and Eighty-Five" from their 1973 album Band on the Run.

Track listing
All songs written and arranged by Dave Azzolini, except for "Nineteen Hundred and Eighty-Five", which is by Paul McCartney.
This album was engineered, mixed and co-produced by Paul Aucoin (The Hylozoists, Cuff the Duke, The Fembots) at Halla Music Studios in Toronto.
"Dynamo"
"Never Meant Any Harm"
"Construction Worker"
"Saints At The Gates"
"Runouttaluck"
"Painting Ape"
"Strong"
"Theresa"
"Nineteen Hundred and Eighty-Five" (Wings cover) 
"Life On The Line"
"Force Of Nature"
"Wheel Of Fortune"

Personnel
Dave Azzolini - Lead vocals, guitar
Jessica Grassia - Backing vocals, keyboards, percussion
Taylor Knox - Drums
Neil Quinn - Backing vocals, guitar

2006 albums
The Golden Dogs albums